General Sir John Hartley Learmont  (born 10 March 1934) is a former British Army officer who served as Quartermaster-General to the Forces.

Military career 
Learmont was commissioned into the Royal Artillery in 1954. He served in Northern Ireland during The Troubles and was mentioned in despatches in 1975.

In 1985 he was appointed Commander Royal Artillery for 1st (British) Corps and in 1987 he became Chief of Staff at Headquarters UK Land Forces. He was appointed Commandant of the Staff College, Camberley in 1988 and then became Military Secretary in 1989. His final appointment was as Quartermaster-General to the Forces in 1991; he retired in 1994.

He was also Colonel Commandant of the Army Air Corps and the Royal Horse Artillery.

In retirement he prepared a report following the escape in January 1995 of three prisoners from Parkhurst Prison.

References

|-
 

|-
 

1934 births
British Army generals
Knights Commander of the Order of the Bath
Commanders of the Order of the British Empire
Royal Artillery officers
Living people
British military personnel of The Troubles (Northern Ireland)
Commandants of the Staff College, Camberley